Glenn Triggs (born 1 April 1983) is an Australian screenwriter, director, producer, editor and music composer. He has directed films such as The Comet Kids (2017), 41 (2012), Apocalyptic (2014) and Dreams of Paper & Ink (2022). Triggs grew up in the eastern suburbs of Melbourne. In his final year of high school, Triggs's first attempt at a feature film, No One, was selected for the Top Arts awards. Triggs studied film and television at the Victorian College of the Arts in 2003 at the age of 19 and went on to write, produce and direct over 40 short films and six features independently, including Cinnamon Rain (2001), The Babyslitter (2003) and Lunar (2005).

Filmography
 Father Jacob Trilogy (1998; 3 shorts x 5min each).
 The War (1999; 6 minutes)
 The Fisherman (2000; 5 minutes)
 Trepidation (2000; 7 minutes)
 The Next Night (2000; 14 minutes)
 No One (2000; 53 minutes)
 Cinnamon Rain (2001; 60 minutes)
 How to Make a Horror Movie (2001; 8 minutes)
 The Babyslitter (2002; 10 minutes)
 Tickets (2002; 8 minutes)
 The Follow (2004; 65 minutes)
 Lunar (2005; 23 minutes – 16mm)
 Cinemaphobia (2010; 82)
 41 (2012; 86 minutes)
 Apocalyptic (2013; 83 minutes)
 Sonnigsburg TV series - (Director/Editor - 1 episode)
 The Comet Kids (2017; 92 minutes)
 Dreams of Paper and Ink (2022; 77 minutes)
 Bakhtak: The Sleep Demon' - In Development 
 Bad Movie - In Development
 The Dark Epic - In Development
 Ancestry Road- In Development
 Video Galaxy'' - In Development

Awards / Festivals

No-One 
 Top Arts (Australia) Finalist (2001)

Lunar 
 Los Angeles Short Film Festival (USA) Finalist (2005)

Cinemaphobia 
 Melbourne Underground Film Festival (Australia) Official Selection (2010)

41 
 Las Vegas Film Festival (USA) Golden Ace Award (2012)
 Made in Melbourne Film Festival (Australia)
 Maverick Movie Awards (New York, USA)
 Winner: Best Original Score
 Nominated: Best Actor
 Nominated: Best Supporting Actress
 Nominated: Best Director
 Nominated: Best Screenplay
 Rhode Island Film Festival (USA)
 Winner: Best Film

Apocalyptic 
 MonsterFest (Australia) Official Selection (2013)
 Mauvis Genre (France) Official Selection (2013)
 British Horror Film Festival (UK) Official Selection (2014)
 Winner: Best Film
 Melbourne Underground Film Festival (Australia) Official Selection (2014)
 British Horror Film Festival (UK) Winner - Best Feature (2014)
 BUT Film Festival (NL) - Official Selection (2014)

The Comet Kids 
 Vision Splendid Outback Film Festival -  Official Selection (2019)

Dreams of Paper & Ink 
 Vision Splendid Outback Film Festival -  Official Selection (2021)

Sources
 http://digital-retribution.com/features/10/ID100302.php 
 http://www.cultprojections.com/interviews/qa-with-glenn-triggs http://www.ukhorrorscene.com/apocalyptic-2014-dvd-review/ 
 http://cinemaaustralia.com.au/2014/03/11/trailer-apocalyptic/ 
 https://web.archive.org/web/20140828170625/http://darkepic.net/press.html https://web.archive.org/web/20140904060655/http://filmink.com.au/news/movies-amp-magic-tricks/ 
 http://thecrat.com/movie-reviews/adam-says-41-is-the-greatest-film-of-all-time/ 
 http://screen-space.squarespace.com/features/2012/4/25/glenn-triggs-hotel-rooms-and-time-travel.html
 http://www.innersense.com.au/mif/triggs.html

1983 births
Living people
Australian screenwriters
Australian directors
Australian film editors